The Saji Observatory is located in Saji, Tottori, Japan. Distance from rotation axis and height above equatorial plane (in Earth radii): 0.81671 +0.57522. Longitude (degrees East): 134.1222

Observatory code is 867.

External links 
 Tottori City Sightseeing - Tottori City Official Website
 Tottori City Saji Astro Park - Starry Sky Project by Mitsubishi Motors

Astronomical observatories in Japan
Planetaria in Japan